Anthony J. O. Maxtone Graham (1900–1971) was the 16th Laird of Culloquhey and 9th Laird of Redgorton and the co-founder of The Redfern Gallery in London in 1923.

A painting of Maxtone Graham by Daniel A. Wehrschmidt is in the City of Edinburgh Council art collection.

References

1900 births
1971 deaths
Lairds
20th-century Scottish businesspeople